Nicky Monet is an American transgender television presenter, reality television personality and drag performer. She is known for participating in a slew of reality TV series including Slag Wars, Hot Haus and Iconic Justice.

Career 
In 2021, she received international recognition when Lady Gaga read a heartfelt letter from Monet on stage, in which she confessed that Gaga's music helped her through depression.

In 2022, Playback announced that Hot Haus, in which Monet is a full-time judge, was picked up for a second season by Out TV.

Monet currently resides in Miami, Florida, where she performs regularly at Palace Bar.

References

Living people
American television personalities
American television hosts
American drag queens
Transgender drag performers
Year of birth missing (living people)